French Camp Academy (FCA) is an interdenominational Christian boarding home and academy in French Camp, Mississippi. It is intended to serve children and teenagers who need opportunities and resources not available in their home or peer environments FCA also serves young people in their area by providing an accredited Christian education for grades 7-12. The school operates several businesses in French Camp, including a bed and breakfast, a gift shop, and a restaurant.

History
A group of Scotch-Irish Christians, under the area Presbyterian Church, established the Central Mississippi Institute for Girls in 1885. The French Camp Academy for Boys opened later in 1885. In 1915 a fire destroyed the girls' school; both the schools for boys and girls combined as the French Camp Academy. In 1950 the school was reorganized under a board of trustees, which represented various Christian denominations.

Location and composition

The school hosts the Rainwater Observatory and Planetarium, the largest planetary observatory in Mississippi. The observatory, with 16 telescopes, has a clear view of outer space since it is far from major cities, which are sources of light pollution. The observatory is open by appointment to members of the public.

Education
Residents of French Camp Academy in Grades K-6 attend a public school, French Camp Elementary School of the Choctaw County School District. Students in grades 7 - 12 attend French Camp Academy's campus facility.

Students are required to wear school uniforms, similar to many private and public schools today. High school students may attend a vocational technology program in the Choctaw Vocational Center in Ackerman.

Support Ministries
The school received the building as a donation in 1967. As part of a bicentennial project of students and staff, the log cabin was restored. The Council House serves sandwiches, salads, soups, bread pudding, and Mississippi mud pie. The school uses the restaurant as a training area for students, and the profits from the restaurant fund scholarships for students.

French Camp operates a bed and breakfast hotel. In 1986 the school moved two clerestory log cabins from Eupora, Mississippi, to French Camp. The cabins, which had been constructed between 1840 and 1860, were placed together and the school established an addition between the cabins. The addition was designed to have the same historic appearance that the original cabins have. The hotel opened in March 1987. In 1990 the school restored an additional cottage, named the B & B Jr., and placed it behind the main building. Carriage House is a building of newer construction which sits on the former location of an 1880s cabin. Another cabin, the Burford Cabin, is the most newly opened accommodation building within the bed and breakfast. The Buford Cabin is accessible for handicapped people. The main building can accommodate up to eight people. The B & B Jr. can accommodate up to six people, the Burford Cabin can house up to four people, and the Carriage House can accommodate up to six people.

WFCA

French Camp Academy hosts the WFCA radio station, a non-profit radio station with its studios located along the Natchez Trace Parkway at Mile Marker 181. H. Richard Cannon, president of the school, conceived of the idea of the radio station while taking a mission field trip in New Guinea.

Festivals
The French Camp village Harvest Festival, held annually every second Saturday of October, has its proceeds benefiting the school.

Demographics
As of 20222 the school served close to 300 students in its home and academic programs. As of 2011 about 300 children and adults live and work on the campus.

See also

 Rainwater Observatory and Planetarium

References

External links
 French Camp Academy

Education in Choctaw County, Mississippi
Educational institutions established in 1885
Buildings and structures in Choctaw County, Mississippi
Hotels in Mississippi
Restaurants in Mississippi
1885 establishments in Mississippi
Boarding schools in Mississippi
Christian schools in Mississippi